The Creation class is a series of similar sized container ships built for Mitsui O.S.K. Lines (MOL) and now operated by Ocean Network Express (ONE). The ships were built by Mitsubishi Heavy Industries Nagasaki Shipyard and Koyo Dockyard in Japan and have a maximum theoretical capacity of around 8,110 to 8,560 twenty-foot equivalent units (TEU).

List of ships

See also 
MOL Triumph-class container ship
MOL Bravo-class container ship
MOL Maestro-class container ship
MOL Globe-class container ship

References 

Container ship classes
Ships built in Japan